Žaškov is a village and municipality in Dolný Kubín District in the Žilina Region of northern Slovakia.

History
In historical records, the village was first mentioned in 1380 as Dewczdorf (1382 Dewsdorff; 1388 Zsaskow). The law system of Žilina was applied here.

References

External links
  Žaškov village website (in Slovak)

Villages and municipalities in Dolný Kubín District